The Oppenheimer Baronetcy, of Stoke Poges in the County of Buckingham, was a title in the Baronetage of the United Kingdom. It was created in the 1921 New Year Honours for Bernard Oppenheimer, Chairman of the South African Diamond Corporation. The title became extinct with the death of the third baronet in 2020.

The first Baronet was the brother of Sir Ernest Oppenheimer.

Oppenheimer baronets, of Stoke Poges (1921)

Sir Bernard Oppenheimer, 1st Baronet (1866–1921)
Sir Michael Oppenheimer, 2nd Baronet (1892–1933)
Sir Michael Bernard Grenville Oppenheimer, 3rd Baronet (1924–2020)

Arms

References

Kidd, Charles, Williamson, David (editors). Debrett's Peerage and Baronetage (1990 edition). New York: St Martin's Press, 1990, 

Extinct baronetcies in the Baronetage of the United Kingdom
Oppenheimer family